Köhn is a municipality in the district of Plön, in Schleswig-Holstein, Germany.

References

Municipalities in Schleswig-Holstein
Plön (district)